The International Textile, Garment and Leather Workers' Federation (ITGLWF) was a global union federation. In 2005 it had 217 member organizations in 110 countries, representing a combined membership of over 10 million workers.

History
The ITGLWF was founded in 1970 as a result of the merger of the International Textile and Garment Workers' Federation and the International Shoe and Leather Workers' Federation. These organizations were preceded by much older ones: the International Glove Workers' Union was founded in 1892, the International Secretariat of Shoemakers in 1893, and the International Secretariat of Leather Workers in 1896. The International Federation of Textile Workers' Associations originated in 1894 and the International Tailors' Secretariat in 1896.

The organization held a congress every four years, consisting of delegates from the member organisations. The congress established the broad lines of the ITGLWF's policies and actions.

The organisation's headquarters was located in Brussels, Belgium. There were four regional organisations within the ITGLWF: FITTVCC/ORI, the Americas' regional organisation, based in Venezuela; ITGLWF/ERO, the European regional organisation, based in Belgium; TWARO, the Asian regional organisation, based in Japan; and ARCC, the African Regional Consultative Council, based in South Africa.

The ITGLWF worked closely with the International Trade Union Confederation and the other global union federations.

In 2007, the International Federation Textile-Clothing, a former affiliate of the World Confederation of Labour, merged into the ITGLWF.  In June 2012 affiliates of ITGLWF joined the new global federation IndustriALL Global Union.

Affiliates
In 1979, the following unions were affiliated to the federation:

Leadership

General Secretaries
1970: Jack Greenhalgh
1971: Charles Ford
1988: Neil Kearney
2009: Patrick Itschert
2011: Klaus Priegnitz

Presidents
1970: John Newton
1972: Karl Buschmann
1980: Harold Gibson
1984: Karl-Erik Persson
1988: Berthold Keller
1992: David Lambert
1996: Peter Booth
2004: Manfred Schallmeyer
2009: Hisanobu Shimada

See also 

 Trade Union International of Textile, Leather and Fur Workers Unions

References

External links
International Textile, Garment and Leather Workers' Federation official site

 
Textile and clothing trade unions
Trade unions disestablished in 2012
Trade unions established in 1970